Elections were held in the organized municipalities in the Manitoulin District of Ontario on October 22, 2018 in conjunction with municipal elections across the province.

Assiginack

Source:

Billings

Source:

Burpee and Mills

Central Manitoulin

Cockburn Island

Gordon/Barrie Island

Gore Bay

Northeastern Manitoulin and the Islands

Tehkummah

References

Manitoulin
Manitoulin District